In mathematical logic and computer science, the Kleene star (or Kleene operator or Kleene closure) is a unary operation, either on sets of strings or on sets of symbols or characters. In mathematics,
it is more commonly known as the free monoid construction. It is widely used for regular expressions, which is the context in which it was introduced by Stephen Kleene to characterize certain automata, where it means "zero or more repetitions".

 If  is a set of strings, then  is defined as the smallest superset of  that contains the empty string  and is closed under the string concatenation operation.

If  is either the empty set ∅ or the singleton set , then ; if  is any other finite set or countably infinite set, then  is a countably infinite set. As a consequence, each formal language over a finite or countably infinite alphabet  is countable, since it is a subset of the countably infinite set .

The operators are used in rewrite rules for generative grammars.

Definition and notation 
Given a set 
define
 (the language consisting only of the empty string),

and define recursively the set
 for each .

If  is a formal language, then , the -th power of the set , is a shorthand for the concatenation of set  with itself  times.

Kleene plus 
In some formal language studies, (e.g. AFL theory) a variation on the Kleene star operation called the Kleene plus is used. The Kleene plus omits the  term in the above union.

or

Examples 
Example of Kleene star applied to set of strings:
 {"ab","c"}* = { ε, "ab", "c", "abab", "abc", "cab", "cc", "ababab", "ababc", "abcab", "abcc", "cabab", "cabc", "ccab", "ccc", ...}.

Example of Kleene plus applied to set of characters:
 {"a", "b", "c"}+ = { "a", "b", "c", "aa", "ab", "ac", "ba", "bb", "bc", "ca", "cb", "cc", "aaa", "aab", ...}.
Kleene star applied to the same character set:
 {"a", "b", "c"}* = { ε, "a", "b", "c", "aa", "ab", "ac", "ba", "bb", "bc", "ca", "cb", "cc", "aaa", "aab", ...}.

Example of Kleene star applied to the empty set:
∅* = {ε}.

Example of Kleene plus applied to the empty set:
∅+ = ∅ ∅* = { } = ∅,
where concatenation is an associative and noncommutative product.

Example of Kleene plus and Kleene star applied to the singleton set containing the empty string:
If , then also  for each , hence .

Generalization 

Strings form a monoid with concatenation as the binary operation and ε the identity element.  The Kleene star is defined for any monoid, not just strings.
More precisely, let (M, ⋅) be a monoid, and S ⊆ M.  Then S* is the smallest submonoid of M containing S; that is, S* contains the neutral element of M, the set S, and is such that if x,y ∈ S*, then x⋅y ∈ S*.

Furthermore, the Kleene star is generalized by including the *-operation (and the union) in the algebraic structure itself by the notion of complete star semiring.

See also
 Wildcard character
 Glob (programming)

References

Further reading

Formal languages
Grammar
Natural language processing